Bresadola is an Italian surname. Notable people with the surname include:

Davide Bresadola (born 1988), Italian Nordic combined skier
Giacomo Bresadola (1847–1929), Italian mycologist
Silvano Bresadola (1906–2002), Italian footballer

Italian-language surnames